The Pittsburgh synagogue shooting was an antisemitic terrorist attack which took place at the Tree of Life – Or L'Simcha Congregation synagogue in the Squirrel Hill neighborhood of Pittsburgh, Pennsylvania, United States. The congregation, along with New Light Congregation and Congregation Dor Hadash, which also worshipped in the building, was attacked during Shabbat morning services on October 27, 2018. The perpetrator killed eleven people and wounded six, including several Holocaust survivors.  It was the deadliest attack ever on the Jewish community in the United States.

A lone suspect, identified as 46-year-old Robert Gregory Bowers, was shot multiple times by police and arrested at the scene. Bowers had earlier posted antisemitic comments against HIAS (formerly, Hebrew Immigrant Aid Society) on the online alt-tech social network Gab. Dor Hadash had participated in HIAS's National Refugee Shabbat the previous week. Referring to Central American migrant caravans and immigrants, Bowers posted a message on Gab in which he wrote that "HIAS likes to bring invaders in that kill our people. I can't sit by and watch my people get slaughtered. Screw your optics, I'm going in." He has been charged with 63 federal crimes, some of which are capital crimes. He has pleaded not guilty. He separately faces 36 charges in Pennsylvania state court.

Background
Tree of Life – Or L'Simcha Congregation is a Conservative Jewish synagogue. The synagogue describes itself as a "traditional, progressive, and egalitarian congregation". The Squirrel Hill neighborhood is one of the largest predominantly Jewish neighborhoods in the United States and has historically been the center of Pittsburgh's Jewish community. About 26 percent of the city's Jewish population live in the area.

Originally founded as an Orthodox Jewish congregation in 1864 in downtown Pittsburgh, by an early group of Jewish immigrants, Tree of Life merged in 2010 with the recently founded Congregation Or L'Simcha. The modern synagogue building, located at the intersection of Wilkins and Shady avenues in Squirrel Hill, was built in 1953. The congregation also rents space to Dor Hadash, a Reconstructionist congregation; and New Light, another Conservative congregation. The synagogue's main sanctuary has a capacity of 1,250 people.

Squirrel Hill has a low crime rate and is not generally regarded as racially tense. However, local rabbinic student Neal Rosenblum was murdered in the neighborhood in 1986 in an antisemitic hate crime.

This 2018 mass shooting took place soon after Columbia University and the Anti-Defamation League independently reported a spike in antisemitic activity online, especially on the popular social networking platforms Instagram and Twitter. In addition, other antisemitic acts had been committed elsewhere.

The immediate rise in the months of August to October 2018 was attributed to rising tensions associated with advertising for the 2018 US midterm elections. A similar rise in online attacks had occurred during the 2016 US election, with the midterms being a "rallying point" for far-right extremists to organize efforts to spread antisemitism online among the populace. In 2017 there was a 57% rise in antisemitic incidents in the United States, in context of rising hate crimes against other groups, including Muslims and African Americans, as reported by the FBI. For instance, hundreds of Jewish gravestones were vandalized in Pennsylvania and Missouri, and antisemitic incidents on university campuses doubled in number.

In August 2017, the widely publicized Unite the Right rally in Charlottesville, Virginia featured Nazi symbols, salutes, and the slogan "Blood and Soil", amid explicit racist and antisemitic rhetoric. Considerable antisemitic material was being spread online via posted conspiracy theories about wealthy Jewish individuals, including billionaire George Soros. Columbia University's Jon Albright said that these represented the "worst sample" of all the hate speech he had seen on Instagram.

Shooting
At 9:45 AM three religious services were underway in the Tree of Life synagogue, which housed three distinct congregations. Tree of Life and New Light had both begun independent Shabbat morning service in the Pervin Chapel and basement, respectively. The Dor Hadash congregants were gathered near the front of the building, prior to their 10:00 a.m. Torah study session.

At 9:50 AM EDT (13:50 UTC), a man, described as a "bearded heavy-set white male", entered the building, opened fire and was "shooting for about 20 minutes." He was armed with a Colt AR-15 semi-automatic rifle (cited by authorities as an "assault rifle") and three Glock .357 SIG semi-automatic pistols, all four of which he fired, according to authorities. There would typically be around 75 people in the building on a Saturday morning.

The first two persons shot were two brothers, Cecil and David Rosenthal, at the main entrance, after which the shooter headed downstairs to New Light. Some hearing the shots did not initially recognize them for what they were: Rabbi Jeffrey Myers, located upstairs, thought a coat rack had fallen and clattered.

By 9:54 AM, police began receiving multiple calls from people barricaded in the building and reporting the attack.

At 9:55 AM, Melvin Wax, the leader of New Light's services, hid in a pitch-black closet in the basement. He opened the door of the closet, and the shooter immediately shot him. The latter did not notice the other three congregants who remained in the closet. Two other members of New Light (Gottfried and Stein) were fatally shot and killed in the basement kitchen. He also killed Jerry Rabinowitz of Dor Hadash, a physician who had gone toward the sound of gunshots to see if anyone had been hurt.

At 9:57 AM, the shooter left the basement and headed upstairs to the larger Tree of Life service. About 13 worshippers had gathered for the Shabbat service in an upstairs chapel. Myers helped four of them evacuate the chapel through a side door, but eight of the worshippers remained behind. The shooter killed seven and wounded one.

Police sources said he shouted at some point during the attack, "All Jews must die!"

At 9:59 AM, police arrived at the synagogue. The shooter fired on police from the entryway, while apparently departing, and police returned fire, forcing him to retreat into the building.

A half hour later, tactical teams entered the building and the shooter also fired upon them. When officers wounded him in return fire, he retreated to the third floor and hid in a room. He had wounded two officers and two SWAT members, one of them critically.

At 11:08 AM, the gunman crawled out of the room and surrendered, having been shot multiple times. As he received medical care in police custody, he allegedly told a SWAT officer that he wanted all Jews to die, and that Jews were committing genocide against his people; this material was included in a criminal complaint filed in Allegheny County.

Victims

Eleven people were killed, including three on the ground level and four in the synagogue's basement. Among the dead were two brothers and a married couple. At least six others were injured, including four Pittsburgh Police officers. Five people were transported to UPMC Presbyterian Hospital, four requiring surgery, while one was treated and released by the afternoon. Another victim was transported to UPMC Mercy, while the accused was taken to Allegheny General Hospital.
Those killed were:

 Joyce Fienberg, 75
 Richard Gottfried, 65
 Rose Mallinger, 97
 Jerry Rabinowitz, 66
 Cecil, 59 & David Rosenthal, 54
 Bernice, 84 & Sylvan Simon, 86
 Daniel Stein, 71
 Melvin Wax, 88
 Irving Younger, 69

Seven others who were injured in the incident included three other congregants and four Pittsburgh officers (two patrol officers and two SWAT officers; three by ricocheted gunfire and another by glass fragments).

Accused 

Robert Gregory Bowers (born September 4, 1972), a resident of Baldwin, Pennsylvania, was arrested as the shooter. Bowers' parents divorced when he was about one year old. His father, Randall Bowers, died by suicide in October 1979 at the age of 26 while he was awaiting trial on a rape charge, when Bowers was 7 years old. Bowers' mother married a Florida man when Bowers was a toddler, and he lived with them in Florida until they separated a year after their marriage.

Upon their return to Pennsylvania, Robert and his mother lived with his mother's parents in Whitehall. His maternal grandparents took responsibility for raising him, because his mother suffered from health problems. Bowers attended Baldwin High School in the Baldwin-Whitehall School District from August 1986 to November 1989. He dropped out of high school before graduation and worked as a trucker. Neighbors described Bowers as "a ghost" and they also said that he rarely interacted with others.

According to accounts which were given by Bowers' coworkers from 20 years ago, and analysis of his recent social media posts, his conservatism became radicalized as white nationalism; at one point Bowers was fascinated by the right-wing radio host Jim Quinn. At a later time he became a follower of "aggressive online provocateurs of the right wing's fringe." He was deeply involved in posting comments on social media websites such as Gab and he also promoted antisemitic conspiracy theories on them.

Gab has been described as "extremist friendly" to neo-Nazis, white supremacists, and the alt-right. Bowers registered his Gab profile in January 2018 under the handle "onedingo"; he described his account by the following: "Jews are the children of Satan. The Lord Jesus Christ [has] come in the flesh." The cover picture was a photo with the number 1488, which is used by neo-Nazis and white supremacists to evoke David Lane's "Fourteen Words" and the Nazi slogan Heil Hitler. Bowers published posts that supported the white genocide conspiracy theory, such as one that said, "Daily Reminder: Diversity means chasing down the last white person". Bowers said that supporters of the QAnon conspiracy theory were "deluded" and being tricked.

Bowers was very active on social media, posting his own similar anti-Semitic and racist rants. He often re-posted content by other similarly minded users, such as Patrick Little, who expressed antisemitic, neo-Nazi, white nationalist/supremacist thoughts and denied the Holocaust. In addition, he reposted comments in support of the Southern California-based alt-right fight club Rise Above Movement (RAM), whose members had attended the August 2017 Unite the Right rally in Charlottesville, Virginia and were later arrested by the FBI and convicted at trial for violence against counter demonstrators. Bowers also posted comments in support of the "Western chauvinist" Proud Boys (led by Gavin McInnes), who were arrested the same month for engaging in a fight with Antifa outside the Metropolitan Republican Club in New York City.

His posts included criticism of US President Donald Trump for being a "globalist, not a nationalist" and for supposedly being surrounded by and controlled by Jews. Bowers also denounced African Americans with racial slurs and images which are related to lynchings, and he also denounced white women who have relationships with black men. He used his online accounts to post conspiracy theories regarding philanthropist George Soros. The Times said that security sources had alleged that Bowers had links to the far-right and neo-Nazis in the United Kingdom.

A month before the attack, Bowers posted photos of results of his target practice. He also posted a photo of his three handguns, calling them his "glock family". In the post, he identified the .357 SIG handguns as Glock 31, Glock 32, and Glock 33.

Bowers coordinated with Brad Griffin (aka Hunter Wallace) of Occidental Dissent, an alt-right associated blogger and member of League of the South on doxxing an unidentified left-wing blogger. Bowers wrote "that address is not the most current for him. I can get you the most recent outside of gab". League of the South was one of the organizations that participated in the Unite the Right Rally in Charlottesville.

In the weeks before the shooting, Bowers made antisemitic posts directed at the HIAS-sponsored National Refugee Shabbat of October 19–20, in which Dor Hadash participated. He claimed Jews were aiding members of Central American caravans moving toward the United States border and referred to those migrants as "invaders". Shortly before the attack, he posted on Gab that "HIAS likes to bring invaders in that kill our people. I can't sit by and watch my people get slaughtered. Screw your optics, I'm going in." According to the Southern Poverty Law Center, "the mention of 'optics' references a disagreement that has raged within the white nationalist movement since the Unite the Right rally in 2017 about how best to get their message across to the general public".

After the shooting, Gab suspended Bowers' profile and pledged to cooperate with the criminal investigation. Shortly after the attack, PayPal, Stripe, Joyent, and Medium pulled their support for Gab, and GoDaddy, under which the Gab domains were registered, required Gab to relocate their domain name hosting to a different service, effectively shutting Gab down in the short term.

Criminal charges and proceedings

Federal criminal proceedings

Indictment and pretrial proceedings
Bowers was charged by the U.S. Department of Justice with 29 federal crimes.

Bowers appeared in federal court in Pittsburgh on October 29, 2018, and was ordered held without bail pending trial. Two days later, Bowers was indicted on 44 counts by a federal grand jury. The charges carry a maximum penalty of death or 535 years in federal prison. The counts included hate crimes, 11 counts of obstruction of exercise of religious beliefs resulting in death, 11 counts of use of a firearm to commit murder during a crime of violence, four counts of obstruction of exercise of religious beliefs resulting in bodily injury to a public safety officer, and three counts of use and discharge of a firearm during a crime of violence. On November 1, 2018, Bowers entered a plea of not guilty.

On January 29, 2019, the grand jury indicted Bowers on an additional 19 counts, 13 of which were for hate crimes. On February 11, 2019, Bowers was arraigned in federal court.

Bowers's defense team includes two public defenders plus well-known criminal defense attorney Judy Clarke, a death penalty expert who was appointed by the court as co-counsel for the defendant.  Federal prosecutors are seeking the death penalty. The defense offered a plea deal in which Bowers would plead guilty in exchange for a sentence of life imprisonment without parole; federal prosecutors declined, seeking the death penalty instead.

The trial date was not set until various pretrial motions were resolved. In April 2020, U.S. District Judge Donetta Ambrose denied a defense challenge to the federal death penalty. In October 2020, Judge Ambrose denied a defense motion to dismiss charges brought under the Hate Crimes Prevention Act and Church Arson Prevention Act. In November 2021, the defense decided that it would not pursue an insanity defense or intellectual disability defense. In January 2022, after holding an earlier evidentiary hearing, Judge Ambrose denied Bowers' motion to suppress evidence of statements he made after being arrested by police, inside an ambulance, and at the hospital the day of the attack. U.S. District Judge Robert J. Colville denied Bowers' motion for a change of venue in March 2022.

Trial
In September 2022, Judge Colville set the trial to begin on April 24, 2023, rejecting a bid by the defense to delay the trial until December 2023. The jury selection process began in March 2023.

State criminal proceedings
Bowers was also charged with 36 state criminal counts, including 11 counts of criminal homicide, six counts of aggravated assault, six counts of attempted criminal homicide, and 13 counts of ethnic intimidation. The state charges are held in abeyance pending the federal trial.

Reactions

United States

President Donald Trump, Pennsylvania Governor Tom Wolf, Braddock Mayor John Fetterman, and Pittsburgh City Councilman Corey O'Connor released statements about the incident through Twitter. Trump called the shooting a wicked, antisemitic act of "pure evil." He also opined that the shooting was preventable: "If there was an armed guard inside the temple, they would have been able to stop him".  Trump suggested cases such as this call for the death penalty.

Cecilia Wang of the American Civil Liberties Union said the attack, along with other recent unrest, was inspired by elements of Trump's rhetoric. Vice President Mike Pence denied any such connection in an NBC News interview that night. Over 2,000 people, including many from the local Jewish community, protested against Trump's visit to the synagogue site, chanting "words have meaning", and carrying signs with such slogans as "We build bridges not walls".

From October 27 to 31, all US flags on public and military grounds were flown at half-staff in memory of the victims.

On the Friday following the shooting, David Shribman, executive editor of the Pittsburgh Post-Gazette, ran the opening of the Hebrew-Aramaic kaddish, often called the Jewish mourner's prayer, as a full-width front-page headline.

In July 2021, the state legislature ended a program that provided grants to organizations considered to be potential terrorist targets. Established in 2019, the program distributed just ten million dollars.

International
The Eiffel Tower in Paris darkened its lights in tribute to the victims of the shooting.

Israel's Prime Minister Benjamin Netanyahu condemned the "horrifying antisemitic brutality", adding "the whole of Israel grieves with the families of the dead." Israel's education and diaspora affairs minister, Naftali Bennett, immediately left for Pittsburgh to visit the synagogue, meet with community members, and participate in the funerals of the victims, and directed the Ministry of Diaspora Affairs "to assess and prepare to assist the Pittsburgh Jewish community, 'including the need for emergency and resilience teams that immediately left Israel for psychological assistance and community rehabilitation.'" Israel's cabinet stood for a moment's silence on October 28 to honor the victims.

Ashkenazi Chief Rabbi of Israel David Lau said "any murder of any Jew in any part of the world for being Jewish is unforgivable". He described the location as "a place with a profound Jewish flavor". Many news reports said he refused to refer to the Conservative congregation as a "synagogue" since it is non-Orthodox. Prominent non-Orthodox Israeli religious leaders and scholars rejected his statement.

Tel Aviv Municipality lit the city hall building with the colors of the American flag in solidarity with the victims of the Pittsburgh attack. An image of the Israeli flag next to the American flag was projected onto Jerusalem's Western Wall.

Pope Francis denounced the "inhuman act of violence" in his Sunday prayers in St. Peter's Square on October 28, and led prayers for the dead and wounded, as well as their families. He asked God "to help us to extinguish the flames of hatred that develop in our societies".

Iranian Minister of Foreign Affairs Javad Zarif offered his thoughts and prayers to the victims of the shooting, and said "Extremism and terrorism know no race or religion, and must be condemned in all cases".

Hamas offered condolences and condemned the attack.

Jan Kickert, Austrian Permanent Representative to the United Nations, said: "The attack ... was an attack on all of us, on what we stand for – religious liberty, human rights. We are committed to the safety and security of Jews wherever they are. I say this with growing up and living with the shame that my forefathers were among the worst perpetrators in Nazi times."

Local

Immediately after the shooting, the campus of Carnegie Mellon University was placed on lockdown and all university-sponsored activities were cancelled for the day. At the same time residents were advised by police to remain in their homes and stay off the streets.

An unusually large proportion of the Pittsburgh Jewish community from all denominations participated in local Jewish rituals related to death and mourning. Jewish tradition requires a person to guard a corpse until it is buried. Shomrim (volunteer guards) took one-hour shifts at the Pittsburgh morgue until the bodies were moved to funeral homes. The Atlantic reported that "most of the volunteers appeared to be Orthodox, but they felt strong solidarity with the liberal communities that were directly affected by the shooting."

Members of the Pittsburgh Steelers attended the joint funeral service for the Rosenthal brothers on Tuesday, October 30, when NFL teams are traditionally off. The brothers, who were intellectually disabled, had a sister who is a former employee of the team.

Media and organizations

The New York Times published an op-ed by Jonathan Greenblatt, CEO of the Anti-Defamation League, that urged readers to fight against antisemitism and hate.

A CNN editorial described the shooting as one of three hate-incited acts that took place in the United States in the same week, along with a series of mail bombing attempts and a shooting at a Kroger grocery store in Jeffersontown, Kentucky.

On October 28, the Empire State Building darkened its lights in honor of the victims. According to the building's Twitter account, the top of the spire was left aglow with "an orange halo shining a light on gun violence awareness". In the wake of the shooting, the University of Pittsburgh darkened its traditional Victory Lights atop of the Cathedral of Learning, and on November 2, the university altered the Victory Lights so the blue beam would shine for 11 seconds, one second for each fatality.

Sports
Sports teams that observed a moment of silence for the shooting victims included the Pittsburgh Steelers at their home game against the Cleveland Browns, the New Orleans Saints at the Minnesota Vikings, the Pittsburgh Penguins at the Vancouver Canucks, the Winnipeg Jets at the Toronto Maple Leafs, the Philadelphia Eagles and the Jacksonville Jaguars playing in London, and the Pittsburgh Panthers hosting Duke at Heinz Field. A moment of silence was also observed before Game 4 of the World Series at Dodger Stadium on the night of October 27.

The Pittsburgh Penguins wore jerseys with a patch that read "Stronger Than Hate" for their game against the New York Islanders on October 30. The team announced that, following the game, the team would auction off the jerseys on behalf of the synagogue. Similarly, the University of Pittsburgh Panthers football team displayed a "Stronger than Hate" decal on their helmets during the November 2 game visiting the University of Virginia.

NFL player Terrell Suggs wore a Star of David on his cleats during a game in October 2019 to commemorate the one-year anniversary of the shooting.

Vigils and rallies

On the evening of the shooting, over 3,000 people gathered at the intersection of Murray and Forbes avenues in Squirrel Hill for an interfaith candlelight vigil; it was organized by students from nearby Taylor Allderdice High School. Two additional vigils were held in the neighborhood.

The day after the shooting, an interfaith vigil organized by the regional Jewish Federation was held at Soldiers and Sailors Memorial Hall, drawing an overflow crowd estimated at 2,500. Attended by numerous national and local dignitaries, the event featured several speakers, including the rabbis of the three congregations that occupied the synagogue building, Islamic and Christian clergy, and civic leaders. Among those in attendance were Bill Peduto, mayor of Pittsburgh; Rich Fitzgerald, Allegheny County executive; Senators Bob Casey and Pat Toomey; Governor Tom Wolf; Naftali Bennett, Israeli Minister for Education and Minister for Diaspora Affairs; Ron Dermer, Israeli ambassador to the United States; and Danny Danon, permanent representative of Israel to the United Nations. A video was streamed during the event featuring Israeli president Reuven Rivlin, who offered brief remarks and led the crowd in a recitation of the Kaddish.

In the week following the attack, Jewish and interfaith communal vigils and solidarity rallies were held across the world. In the United States, these were attended by hundreds or thousands of people, in many cities across the nation. In Canada, they were held in Montreal, Ottawa, Halifax, Vancouver and other places. In Israel, approximately 500 Americans and Israelis lit candles on the night of October 28 at Zion Square in Jerusalem. In Europe, Jewish communal vigils were held in London, Liverpool, Brighton, and Paris.

College students at more than one hundred campuses across the country held vigils in the days following the shootings in memory of the victims.

The American Jewish Committee and the Jewish Federations of North America called for Jews and non-Jews to attend synagogue services on the Shabbat following the attack, under the hashtag #ShowUpForShabbat. NBC News reported thousands of people around the world attended services in local synagogues, community centers, and college campuses, including Mayor of London Sadiq Khan. Additionally, many congregations recited the prayer for martyrs Av HaRachamim even though it would normally be omitted that Shabbat.

Presidential visit

On October 30, Trump flew to Pittsburgh on Air Force One, accompanied by First Lady Melania Trump, daughter Ivanka Trump, son-in-law Jared Kushner, and Treasury Secretary Steven Mnuchin. They went to the synagogue, where they met with Tree of Life spiritual leader Jeffrey Myers and Israeli ambassador to the US Ron Dermer. Trump lit candles for the victims inside and outside placed stones on each of the 11 Star-of-David markers of the memorial. The group went to UPMC Presbyterian Hospital, where Trump spoke with wounded victims, their families, law enforcement officials, and medical staff.

Trump's visit was discouraged by some in the Pittsburgh community. Pittsburgh mayor Bill Peduto said Trump should not have come, as the wounds were raw and the community was just beginning to mourn and hold funerals. Peduto, with agreement from Allegheny County executive Rich Fitzgerald, also urged Trump to consider "the wills of the families" of the deceased. More than 70,000 people had signed an open letter written by Bend the Arc: Pittsburgh saying that Trump was not welcome until he "fully denounces white nationalism". Former Tree of Life president Lynette Lederman opposed Trump's visit, saying she felt his words were "hypocritical" and that "We have people who stand by us who believe in values, not just Jewish values, but believe in values, and those are not the values of this president, and I do not welcome him to Pittsburgh".

Before Trump's visit, Tree of Life rabbi Jeffrey Myers said,
"There is hate, and it isn't going away. It just seems to be getting worse. ... We've got to stop hate, and it can't just be to say we need to stop hate. We need to do, we need to act to tone down rhetoric," adding that he would welcome a visit from Trump.Aaron Bisno, the rabbi of Rodef Shalom Congregation, said he did not think Trump's presence was beneficial, saying that Trump had become a "symbol of division" for many. During Trump's visit to the synagogue, an estimated 2,000 protesters were cordoned off a few blocks away. Afterward, Rabbi Jeffrey Myers said, "The President was very warm, very consoling."

Neo-Nazis and white supremacists
Among American neo-Nazis and white supremacists, figures such as Andrew Anglin of The Daily Stormer, Matthew Heimbach of the now defunct Traditionalist Workers Party, Richard B. Spencer of the National Policy Institute, Patrick Casey of Identity Evropa/American Identity Movement, Greg Johnson of Counter-Currents Publishing and the messageboard forum Stormfront expressed the fear that the backlash over the attack could derail their efforts to gain mainstream political acceptance.

4chan users on the /pol/ board viewed the attack as "accidentally redpilling" people and denied that it had occurred. They claimed the purported attack was a "false flag" committed by Jews to gain sympathy. Some users praised the Pittsburgh synagogue shooting and created the hashtag #HeroRobertBowers to express support for the shooter on Gab. A multiple-choice poll was posted asking for the best option for Jewish people in the West: 35% of respondents chose "Genocide". In another poll, the question "Do you support the Pittsburgh synagogue shooter, Robert Bowers?" was posted; nearly 25% of respondents said yes, and some added inflammatory remarks.

Fundraising efforts
Numerous fundraising efforts were launched in order to assist the survivors of the shooting, pay for the burial of the victims, and pay for the repairs to the synagogue. As of November 1, a GoFundMe campaign which was initiated by an Iranian graduate student in Washington, D.C., had exceeded US$1 million in donations, and a new goal of US$1.2 million has also been surpassed. Muslim groups opened a LaunchGood crowdfunding campaign to help pay for the burial of the victims and survivors' medical bills, with the funds to be distributed by the Islamic Center of Pittsburgh. As of November 1, that campaign had exceeded its goal of $150,000 with more than $225,000 in contributions.

The organizers of the campaign announced that all excess funds would be "spent on projects that help foster Muslim-Jewish collaboration, dialogue, and solidarity". The Jewish Federation of Greater Pittsburgh raised $3.65 million for victims by November 13; donations to that organization were to be matched by the United Way of Southwestern Pennsylvania and the Pittsburgh Foundation. Fundraising campaigns for shooting victims in the Dor Hadash and New Light congregations raised nearly $23,000 combined.

A $6.3 million fund was raised for the survivors of the Pittsburgh synagogue shooting, the families of the 11 dead, and police officers.

Documentary
In 2022, A Tree of Life: The Pittsburgh Synagogue Shooting documentary was released by HBO Documentary Films.

See also
 Antisemitic trope
 Antisemitism in the United States
 Antisemitism in the United States in the 21st-century
 Geography of antisemitism#United States
 History of antisemitism in the United States
 List of attacks on Jewish institutions in the United States
 List of conspiracy theories#Antisemitism
 List of right-wing terrorist attacks
 List of synagogue shootings
 Radical right (United States)
 Right-wing terrorism#United States
 Terrorism in the United States
 Domestic terrorism in the United States
 Timeline of terrorist attacks in the United States

Pittsburgh
 History of the Jews in Pittsburgh
 Murder of Neal Rosenblum
 2009 shooting of Pittsburgh police officers

Other antisemitic attacks
 Atlanta Hebrew Benevolent Congregation Temple bombing (1958)
 Los Angeles Jewish Community Center shooting (1999)
 Seattle Jewish Federation shooting (2006)
 United States Holocaust Memorial Museum shooting (2009)
 Poway synagogue shooting (2019)
 Halle synagogue shooting (2019)
 2019 Jersey City shooting
 Monsey Hanukkah stabbing (2019)
 Colleyville synagogue hostage crisis (2022)

Notes

References

External links

 Tree of Life – Or L'Simcha Congregation official website
 
 New Light Congregation official website
 Official Gab account of the accused, second archive, A YouTube video featuring the feed of the accused's account with a police scanner,
 Vigil for Pittsburgh shooting victims

2018 in Judaism
2018 in Pennsylvania
2018 mass shootings in the United States
2010s in Pittsburgh
21st-century attacks on synagogues and Jewish communal organizations in the United States
Alt-right terrorism
Antisemitism in Pennsylvania
Crimes in Pittsburgh
Deaths by firearm in Pennsylvania
Hate crimes
Jews and Judaism in Pittsburgh
Mass shootings in Pennsylvania
Massacres in religious buildings and structures
Massacres in the United States
Neo-fascist terrorist incidents in the United States
Neo-Nazism in the United States
October 2018 crimes in the United States
Terrorist incidents in Pennsylvania
Terrorist incidents in the United States in 2018
Trump administration controversies
White genocide conspiracy theory
White nationalism in Pennsylvania
Mass shootings in the United States
2018 active shooter incidents in the United States